Little Holm is a small island in Yell Sound, in Shetland, Scotland. It lies between Northmavine and the island of Yell.

There is a lighthouse here.

In 1983, the Royal Navy cleared ordnance from the area, and their bomb disposal team discovered an unrecorded shipwreck nearby. Its identity is still unknown.

See also

 List of lighthouses in Scotland
 List of Northern Lighthouse Board lighthouses

References

External links
 Northern Lighthouse Board

Uninhabited islands of Shetland